|}

The Stardom Stakes, also known as the Peter Willett Stakes, was a conditions flat horse race in Great Britain open to two-year-old thoroughbreds. It was run at Goodwood over a distance of 7 furlongs (1,408 metres),and took place each year in late August or early September.

History
The event was established in 1978, and it was initially called the Westhampnett Stakes. It was named after Westhampnett, a village to the south of Goodwood. It became known as the Chromacopy Stakes in 1983.

The race was given Listed status and renamed the Stardom Stakes in 1987. Its original distance of 1 mile was cut to 7 furlongs in 2009 and it was renamed the Peter Willett Stakes in recognition of a long-serving director of Goodwood Racecourse. The race lost its Listed status in 2013, being replaced in the calendar by the Flying Scotsman Stakes at Doncaster.

The race was replaced by a valuable sire-restricted Maiden (Peter Willett Maiden Stakes), run over 1 mile, in 2017.

Records
Leading jockey (2 wins):
 Pat Dobbs – Fantastic View (2003), Bronterre (2011), Palawan (2015)

Leading trainer (4 wins):
 Henry Cecil – Clear Verdict (1980), Royal Coach (1984), Mashkour (1985), Zalazl (1988)
 Richard Hannon Sr. - Innishowen (1993), Fantastic View (2003), Bronterre (2011), Palawan (2015)

Winners

See also
 Horse racing in Great Britain
 List of British flat horse races
 Recurring sporting events established in 1978  – this race is included under its original title, Westhampnett Stakes.

References

 Paris-Turf: 
 Racing Post:
 pedigreequery.com – Stardom Stakes – Goodwood.

Flat races in Great Britain
Goodwood Racecourse
Flat horse races for two-year-olds